Nowogród  is a village in the administrative district of Gmina Zbójna, within Łomża County, Podlaskie Voivodeship, in north-eastern Poland.

References

Villages in Łomża County